Joan May Blackman (born in San Francisco, California) is an American actress.

Film
Blackman appeared in her first motion picture, Good Day for a Hanging, in 1959. She had a significant role in two Elvis Presley films. She played Maile Duval in the 1961 film Blue Hawaii, and the following year played Rose Grogan in Kid Galahad. She also appeared with Dean Martin in Career (1959), and played Ellen Spelding, the love interest of Kreton, the character of Jerry Lewis in Visit to a Small Planet (1960). Her other film appearances included roles in The Great Impostor (1961), Twilight of Honor (1963), Daring Game (1968), Pets (1974), Macon County Line (1974), and Moonrunners (1975). In 1985, Blackman played the mother in the Ray Davies film, Return to Waterloo.

Television
Blackman made her television-acting debut as a guest performer in a 1957 series, Hawkeye and the Last of the Mohicans.
Among her television appearances was her role as Hilary Gray in the 1964 Perry Mason episode "The Case of the Ruinous Road." She played opposite Jack Lemmon in the episode "Disappearance" of Alcoa Theatre in 1958 and also made single appearances on Bonanza, I Spy, and Gunsmoke.

During the 1965–1966 season, Blackman was part of the regular cast of the primetime television serial Peyton Place. On that show, she played Marion Fowler, the wife to the district attorney.

Personal life
In May 1959, Blackman married Joby Baker, a fellow actor she met in drama school. The couple divorced two years later, in November 1961. She then married actor Rockne Tarkington in July 1968. They had two children before divorcing in October 1970.

References

External links

Joan Blackman, Elvis Women

Living people
Actresses from San Francisco
American film actresses
American soap opera actresses
American television actresses
20th-century American actresses
21st-century American women
Year of birth missing (living people)